is the twenty-fourth studio album by Japanese heavy metal band Loudness, released on September 14, 2011. The album reached number 36 on the Oricon chart.

In an interview, guitarist Akira Takasaki described the album as more "aggressive" than King of Pain. Saying, the previous album was focused on featuring drummer Masayuki Suzuki, but that Eve to Dawn would be guitar driven. Singer Minoru Niihara said that the lyrics has a more positive vibe than in previous releases because of the impact of the Great East Japan earthquake and the instrumental "A Light in the Dark" was dedicated by Takasaki to that tragic event.

Regarding the album title "Eve to Dawn", 'Eve' was added due to the fact that Loudness celebrated the 30th anniversary of their debut album The Birthday Eve and that the late Munetaka Higuchi's birthday was on Christmas Eve, 'Dawn' has the double meaning of a new start towards the world, as well as the rising sun of Japan.

Track listing
All lyrics by Minoru Niihara, English lyrics co-written by Takashi Kanazawa. All music by Akira Takasaki, except track 4 by Masayuki Suzuki and track 5 by Masayoshi Yamashita.

"A Light in the Dark" (instrumental) - 1:46
"The Power of Truth" - 5:27
"Come Alive Again" - 4:25
"Survivor" - 5:44
"Keep You Burning" - 5:16
"Gonna Do It My Way" - 4:12
"Hang Tough" - 5:54
"Kidoairaku" (喜怒哀楽) (instrumental) - 6:21
"Comes the Dawn" - 7:04
"Pandora" - 4:17
"Crazy! Crazy! Crazy!" - 3:23

Personnel
Loudness
Minoru Niihara – vocals
Akira Takasaki – guitars, keyboards, vocals on track 5
Masayoshi Yamashita – bass
Masayuki Suzuki – drums

Production
Masatoshi Sakimoto - engineer, mixing at Freedom Studio, Tokyo
Takeru Maeyama, Takuya Wada - assistant engineers
Manfred Melchior - mastering at MM Sound, Steinhagen, Germany
Hirose Shiraishi - supervisor
Masahiro Shinoki, Shunji Inoue - executive producers

References

2011 albums
Loudness (band) albums
Japanese-language albums
Tokuma Shoten albums